South Taft is a census-designated place (CDP) in Kern County, California, United States. The population was 2,169 at the 2010 census, up from 1,898 at the time of the 2000 census.

Geography

Demographics

2010
At the 2010 census South Taft had a population of 2,169. The racial makeup of South Taft was 1,404 (64.7%) White, 21 (1.0%) African American, 55 (2.5%) Native American, 5 (0.2%) Asian, 11 (0.5%) Pacific Islander, 596 (27.5%) from other races, and 77 (3.6%) from two or more races. Hispanic or Latino of any race were 931 people (42.9%).

The census reported that 2,028 people (93.5% of the population) lived in households, 141 (6.5%) lived in non-institutionalized group quarters, and no one was institutionalized.

There were 606 households, 293 (48.3%) had children under the age of 18 living in them, 251 (41.4%) were opposite-sex married couples living together, 117 (19.3%) had a female householder with no husband present, 72 (11.9%) had a male householder with no wife present.  There were 73 (12.0%) unmarried opposite-sex partnerships, and 4 (0.7%) same-sex married couples or partnerships. 115 households (19.0%) were one person and 33 (5.4%) had someone living alone who was 65 or older. The average household size was 3.35.  There were 440 families (72.6% of households); the average family size was 3.75.

The age distribution was 732 people (33.7%) under the age of 18, 275 people (12.7%) aged 18 to 24, 567 people (26.1%) aged 25 to 44, 457 people (21.1%) aged 45 to 64, and 138 people (6.4%) who were 65 or older.  The median age was 27.1 years. For every 100 females, there were 116.9 males.  For every 100 females age 18 and over, there were 119.1 males.

There were 733 housing units at an average density of 681.1 per square mile, of the occupied units 270 (44.6%) were owner-occupied and 336 (55.4%) were rented. The homeowner vacancy rate was 3.8%; the rental vacancy rate was 8.9%.  790 people (36.4% of the population) lived in owner-occupied housing units and 1,238 people (57.1%) lived in rental housing units.

2000
At the 2000 census there were 1,898 people, 629 households, and 471 families living in the CDP. The racial makeup of the CDP was 79.14% White, 0.37% Black or African American, 1.95% Native American, 0.11% Asian, 0.79% Pacific Islander, 13.96% from other races, and 3.69% from two or more races.  25.66% of the population were Hispanic or Latino of any race.
Of the 629 households 41.0% had children under the age of 18 living with them, 46.6% were married couples living together, 18.3% had a female householder with no husband present, and 25.0% were non-families. 20.7% of households were one person and 9.7% were one person aged 65 or older.  The average household size was 3.02 and the average family size was 3.39.

The age distribution was 35.1% under the age of 18, 9.0% from 18 to 24, 29.0% from 25 to 44, 17.5% from 45 to 64, and 9.4% 65 or older.  The median age was 29 years. For every 100 females, there were 104.3 males.  For every 100 females age 18 and over, there were 94.3 males.

The median household income was $20,921 and the median family income  was $23,317. Males had a median income of $28,889 versus $24,635 for females. The per capita income for the CDP was $9,929.  About 29.6% of families and 39.5% of the population were below the poverty line, including 61.7% of those under age 18 and 21.4% of those age 65 or over.

References

Census-designated places in Kern County, California
Census-designated places in California